Bombay is the former name of the city of Mumbai in Maharashtra state of India.

Bombay may also refer to:

Places 
 Bombay State, the name of a former state in India, partitioned in 1960 into Gujarat and Maharashtra — previously a province known as Bombay Presidency in British India
 Isle of Bombay, one of the seven islands merged to create the city of Bombay
 The Bombay Hills, New Zealand mark the traditional southern boundary of Auckland
 Bombay, a small village in the Bombay Hills
 Bombay, New York, a town in the United States
 Bombay, Jersey City, New Jersey, an Indian enclave in the United States
 Bombay Beach, California, a settlement in the United States

Animals
 Bombay (cat), a breed of domestic cat
 Bombay duck, a fish named after Bombay

Film and television 
 Bombay (film), a 1995 Indian Tamil film by Mani Ratnam
 Bombay (soundtrack), a soundtrack album from the 1995 film
 Dr. Bombay (character), a character in the television series Bewitched
 Gordon Bombay, head coach and protagonist of the Mighty Ducks film trilogy

Food and drink 
 Bombay mix, a traditional Indian snack
 Bombay (mango), a mango cultivar originating in Jamaica
 Bombay Sapphire, a brand of gin

Transport
 Bombay (ship), a list of ships named Bombay
 The Bristol Bombay, a British bomber aircraft named after the Indian city
 , the name of several Royal Navy ships
 45576 Bombay, a British LMS Jubilee Class locomotive

Others 
 Bombay blood group, an extremely rare blood group
 Bombay High Court, the high court of the Indian state of Maharashtra.
 Bombay Before the British, or "BBB", a Portuguese research project in History of Architecture (2004–2007)
 Bombay Company (and Bombay Outlet), a chain of shops selling household goods and furniture
 Bombay Dyeing, a textiles manufacturer from India
 Ghulam Bombaywala, Pakistani-American restaurateur, nicknamed Bombay
 Dr. Bombay, pseudonym of Eurodance artist Jonny Jakobsen
 Bombay Bicycle Club, a band from London
Bombay Tribune, English Newspaper published from Mumbai.
Bombae, Canadian drag queen

See also 
 Bomb bay, the area of a bomber aircraft where the bombs are stored
 Mumbai (disambiguation)